The History of Rail Transport includes several important events dating to the years before 1700. The earliest such event took place in 1427, well over 300 years before the first iron rails were manufactured.

Events

1427 
 First known reference to the use of a Rail" was in India, now Calcutta

 1513 
 First known dated depiction of a railed vehicle, a Train" was in China, now Beijing.

1515 
 The First Railway was in Thailand, Phuket.

1571 
 Presumed date of site with the first known rails in the British Isles, Emanuel Stolne silver mine near Caldbeck in the Lake District, worked by Austrian miners.

1604 
 October 1 - The Wollaton Wagonway, from Strelley, Nottingham to Wollaton in England, is known to have been completed by this date, being the world's first recorded overland wagonway. It ran for approximately two miles (5 km) and was built for coal haulage by Huntingdon Beaumont.

1645 
 Widow Howborne is recorded as a gatekeeper on the Whickham waggonway in County Durham, England, the first known female railway employee.

See also 
 History of rail transport
 Years in rail transport

References 
 

Rail transport timelines